Ántero Asto Flores is a Peruvian educator and politician. He was Resurgimiento Peruano's presidential candidate for the 2006 national election.

See also
Politics of Peru

References

External links
Resurgimiento Peruano's site

Living people
Candidates for President of Peru
Peruvian Resurgence politicians
Year of birth missing (living people)
Place of birth missing (living people)
21st-century Peruvian politicians